The Aeromarine 700 was an early US Navy seaplane developed in 1917 to investigate the feasibility of using aircraft to launch torpedoes. The aircraft itself was a large biplane of conventional three-bay configuration equipped with two pontoons, powered by a  Aeromarine K-6. Only two examples were built.

Operators
 US Navy

References

 Taylor, J. H. (ed) (1989) Jane's Encyclopedia of Aviation. Studio Editions: London. p. 29

Floatplanes
Single-engined tractor aircraft
Biplanes
1910s United States bomber aircraft
700
Aircraft first flown in 1917